Grenadiers or rattails are generally large, brown to black gadiform marine fish of the subfamily Macrourinae, the largest subfamily of the family Macrouridae. Found at great depths from the Arctic to Antarctic, members of this subfamily are amongst the most abundant of the deep-sea fish.

The macrourins form a large and diverse family with 28 extant genera recognized (well over half of the total species are contained in just three genera, Coelorinchus, Coryphaenoides, and Nezumia). Several attempts have been made to establish a commercial fishery for the most common larger species, such as the giant grenadier, but the fish is considered unpalatable, and attempts thus far have proven unsuccessful. The subfamily as a whole may represent up to 15% of the deep-sea fish population.

Rattails, characterized by large heads with large mouths and eyes, have slender bodies that taper very much to very thin caudal peduncles or tails (except for one species without a caudal fin): this rat-like tail explains the common name "rattail" and the name of the subfamily  and the surname are derived from the Greek makros meaning "big" and Oura meaning "tail".  The first dorsal flat is small, tall and pointed (and may have rays modified into spines);  The second dorsal fin runs along the rest of the back and connects to the tail and the large anal fin.  The scales are small.

As with many deep-living fish, the lateral line system in grenadiers is well-developed; it is further aided by numerous chemoreceptors located on the head and lips and chemosensory barbels underneath the chin. Benthic species have swim bladders with unique muscles attached to them. The animals are thought to use these muscles to "strum" their bladders and produce sound, possibly playing a role in courtship and mate location. Light-producing organs, photophores, are present in some species; they are located in the middle of the abdomen, just before the anus and underneath the skin.

They may be solitary or may form large schools, as with the roundnose grenadiers. The benthic species are attracted to structural oases, such as hydrothermal vents, cold seeps, and shipwrecks. They are thought to be generalists, feeding on smaller fish, pelagic crustaceans such as shrimp, amphipods, cumaceans, and less often cephalopods and lanternfish. As well as being important apex predators in the benthic habitat, some species are also notable as scavengers.

As few rattail larvae have been recovered, little is known of their life histories. They are known to produce a large number (over 100,000) of tiny ( in diameter) eggs made buoyant by lipid droplets. The eggs are presumed to float up to the thermocline (the interface between warmer surface waters and cold, deeper waters) where they develop. The juveniles remain in shallower waters, gradually migrating to greater depths with age.

Spawning may or may not be tied to the seasons, depending on the species. At least one species, Coryphaenoides armatus, is thought to be semelparous; that is, the adults die after spawning. Nonsemelparous species may live to 56 years or more. The macrourins, in general, are thought to have low resilience; commercially exploited species may be overfished and this could soon lead to a collapse of their fisheries.

Genera 
Currently 28 extant genera in this subfamily are recognized:
 Albatrossia Jordan & Gilbert, 1898
 Asthenomacrurus Sazonov & Shcherbachev, 1982
 Cetonurichthys Sazonov & Shcherbachev, 1982
 Cetonurus Günther, 1887
 Coelorinchus Giorna, 1809
 Coryphaenoides Gunnerus, 1765
 Cynomacrurus Dollo, 1909
 Echinomacrurus Roule, 1916
 Haplomacrourus Trunov, 1980
 Hymenocephalus Giglioli, 1884
 Hymenogadus Gilbert & Hubbs, 1920
 Kumba Marshall, 1973
 Kuronezumia Iwamoto, 1974
 Lepidorhynchus Richardson, 1846
 Lucigadus Gilbert & Hubbs, 1920
 Macrosmia Merrett, Sazonov & Shcherbachev, 1983
 Macrourus Bloch, 1786
 Malacocephalus Günther, 1862
 Mataeocephalus Berg, 1898
 Mesovagus Nakayama & Endo, 2016 
 Nezumia Jordan, 1904
 Odontomacrurus Norman, 1939
 Paracetonurus Marshall, 1973
 Pseudocetonurus Sazonov & Shcherbachev, 1982
 Pseudonezumia Okamura, 1970
 Sphagemacrurus Fowler, 1925
 Spicomacrurus Okamura, 1970
 Trachonurus Günther, 1887
 Ventrifossa Gilbert & Hubbs, 1920

See also
 List of fish common names

References

Macrouridae
Taxa named by Charles Lucien Bonaparte